Steve Mouzakis is an Australian film, television and theatre actor. He is known for his role in the Spike Jonze film Where the Wild Things Are, Van Gogh in Prison Break, Steven Ray in the film The Suicide Theory, and performing alongside Joel Edgerton and Sean Harris as Paul in the 2022 film The Stranger.

Education
Mouzakis studied Arts and Engineering at university before being accepted into the  Victorian College Of The Arts to study acting.

He graduated winning the Irene Mitchell Award for Outstanding Achievement for his portrayal of William Shakespeare's Pericles, in a production directed by George Ogilvie.

Career
He was cast in Christos Tsiolkas' Viewing Blue Poles, performed at the Belvoir St. Theatre in Sydney, after a critically acclaimed Melbourne season.

His first television role came as that of Paolo in The Secret Life of Us, which went on to become one of the most watched and successful Australian TV shows of all time. He was next cast by director Jonathan Liebesman in the horror film Darkness Falls which opened at number one at the U.S. box office in January 2003.

His interest however in smaller and more personal films led to his performances in the short films Mona Lisa and 296 Smith Street. This brought him to the attention of the director Spike Jonze for his adaptation of the children's story Where the Wild Things Are. 

Mouzakis has had a number of roles in television series such as Rolf in Very Small Business, Andrew Petrious in The Slap, Chris Baros in Killing Time, Theo Kallergis in Blue Heelers and Paolo in The Secret Life of Us. Other feature film credits include Darkness Falls (Sony Pictures), Big Mamma's Boy, and I, Frankenstein (Lionsgate).

He played Steven Ray in the 2014 film  The Suicide Theory.

Mouzakis played Van Gogh as a series regular in the 2017 comeback of the Fox television series Prison Break season 5.

He also appeared in the Tourism Victoria Wander Victoria campaign in 2017 as the face of his home state of Victoria, Australia.

Awards
2013: Best Actor, St Kilda Film Festival, for playing Joey in the short film Joey.
2014: Green Room Award for Male Actor in the Theatre Companies category, for his performance as Lophakin in the Melbourne Theatre Company's production of The Cherry Orchard.

Filmography

References

External links

Australian male film actors
Australian male television actors
Living people
Male actors from Melbourne
Year of birth missing (living people)
Australian people of Greek Cypriot descent
21st-century Australian male actors